Bonab County is in East Azerbaijan province, Iran. The capital of the county is the city of Bonab. At the 2006 census, the county's population was 125,209 in 31,921 households. The following census in 2011 counted 129,795 people in 37,353 households. At the 2016 census, the county's population was 134,892 in 42,325 households. The county is located on the east side of Lake Urmia.

The main language spoken is Azeri. The name of the city, however, is like most other towns in East Azerbaijan, of the Azeri Turkish origin, means "1000 houses". The meaning "water base" can be considered true because back when the lake Urmia had not lost more than half of its water, digging ground for 5 meters gained your access to water in Bonab. but it's not an original meaning.

Administrative divisions

The population history of Bonab County's administrative divisions over three consecutive censuses is shown in the following table. The latest census shows one district, three rural districts, and one city.

Bicycle city of Iran
The Great Cycling Conference in 1996 was founded by Mohammad Mirzadoost, head of the Bonab Sports Bureau and former Governor of Bonab. And this conference is held annually with the presence of more than 30,000 bicycle riders in Bonab. In the end, awards will be awarded to the participants by lottery. In the city, there are at least one bike in every building, and most people go to work with their bikes.

Politics 
Bonab (electoral district)

References

 

Counties of East Azerbaijan Province